is a railway station on the Tobu Tojo Line in Itabashi, Tokyo, Japan, operated by the private railway operator Tobu Railway.

Lines
Only "Local" (all-stations) services stop at this station, with eight trains per hour in each direction during the daytime.

Station layout
The station consists of two island platforms serving four tracks. Platforms 2 and 3 are used to allow non-stop trains to pass stopping trains.

Platforms

History
The station opened on 12 July 1933.

From 17 March 2012, station numbering was introduced on the Tobu Tojo Line, with Naka-Itabashi Station becoming "TJ-05".

Passenger statistics
In fiscal 2014, the station was used by an average of 26,961 passengers daily. The passenger figures for previous years are as shown below.

Surrounding area
 Shakujii River

See also
 List of railway stations in Japan

References

External links

Naka-Itabashi Station information 

Tobu Tojo Main Line
Stations of Tobu Railway
Railway stations in Tokyo
Railway stations in Japan opened in 1933